The 2004 Tour de Georgia was the second annual bicycle road racing event held in the state of Georgia, United States. The six-day, seven stage 1050 km race was held April 20 through April 25, 2004 with no winner declared for the overall title and yellow jersey, following the disqualification of the first-placed rider for using illegal drugs and practices to win. Canadian Gord Fraser (Health Net Pro Cycling Team Presented by Maxxis) claimed the points jersey for sprinters, while teammate Jason McCartney won the King of the Mountains competition for climbers. Kevin Bouchard-Hall (TIAA-CREF) won the Best Young Rider (blue jersey) competition.

Stages
 Stage 1 132.2 km Stage Race, Macon to Macon
 Winner: Gord Fraser, Health Net Pro Cycling Team Presented by Maxxis

 General classification after stage 1
 
 1 Gord Fraser (Can) Health Net Presented by Maxxis                   3.18.48
 2 Ivan Dominguez (Cub) Colavita Olive Oil, presented by Bolla Wines     0.05
 3 Jens Voigt (Ger) Team CSC                                             0.07

 Stage 2 189.9 km Stage Race, Thomaston to Columbus
 Winner: Mario Cipollini, Domina Vacanze

 General classification after stage 2
 
 1 Gord Fraser (Can) Health Net Presented by Maxxis                   7.59.28
 2 Ivan Dominguez (Cub) Colavita Olive Oil, presented by Bolla Wines     0.03
 3 Mario Cipollini (Ita) Domina Vacanze                                  0.05

 Stage 3 126.2 km Stage Race, Carrollton to Rome
 Winner: Lance Armstrong, U.S. Postal Service Pro Cycling Team presented by Berry Floor

 General classification after stage 3
 
 1 Ivan Dominguez (Cub) Colavita Olive Oil, presented by Bolla Wines    10.41.09
 2 Gord Fraser (Can) Health Net Presented by Maxxis                         0.01
 3 Mario Cipollini (Ita) Domina Vacanze                                     0.06

 Stage 4 29.9 km Time Trial, Rome to Rome
 Winner: Lance Armstrong, U.S. Postal Service Pro Cycling Team presented by Berry Floor

 General classification after stage 4
 
 DQ Lance Armstrong (USA) US Postal Service presented by Berry Floor      11.21.10
 2 Jens Voigt (Ger) Team CSC                                                 0.24
 3 Chris Horner (USA) Webcor Builders                                        0.51

 Stage 5 224.3 km Stage Race, Dalton to Dahlonega
 Winner: Jason McCartney, Health Net Pro Cycling Team Presented by Maxxis

 General classification after stage 5
 
 DQ Lance Armstrong (USA) US Postal Service presented by Berry Floor      17.02.19
 2 Jens Voigt (Ger) Team CSC                                                 0.24
 3 Chris Horner (USA) Webcor Builders                                        0.51

 Stage 6 224.3 km Stage Race, Athens to Hiawassee/Young Harris
 Winner: César Grajales, Jittery Joe's

 General classification after stage 6
 
 DQ Lance Armstrong (USA) US Postal Service/Berry Floor                   22.19.05
 2 Jens Voigt (Ger) Team CSC                                                 0.24
 3 Chris Horner (USA) Webcor Builders                                        1.01

 Stage 7 142.3 km Stage Race, Dawsonville to Alpharetta
 Winner: Gord Fraser, Health Net Pro Cycling Team Presented by Maxxis

Stage Winners Progress

Yellow Jersey Progress

Final Results

General Classification

Points Classification

King of The Mountains Classification

Best Young Rider

Team Competition 
  Team CSC
followed in no particular order
  U.S. Postal Service Pro Cycling Team presented by Berry Floor
  Health Net Pro Cycling Team Presented by Maxxis 
  Domina Vacanze
  Barloworld–Androni Giocattoli
  Landbouwkrediet–Colnago
  Saeco–Saunier Duval
  Colavita Olive Oil presented by Bolla Wines   
  Jelly Belly/Aramark
  Jittery Joe's Coffee 
  Navigators Insurance Cycling Team
  Ofoto/Lombardi Sports 
  Sierra Nevada Cycling
  USA National Cycling Team
  Webcor Builders

Notes

References
cyclingnews
Tour de Georgia official site
Tour de Georgia blog

Tour de Georgia
2004 in road cycling
2004 in American sports